Pomonte is a village in Tuscany, central Italy, administratively a frazione of the comune of Scansano, province of Grosseto. At the time of the 2001 census its population amounted to 26.

Pomonte is about 40 km from Grosseto and 14 km from Scansano, and it is situated on the hills along the Amiatina Provincial Road.

Main sights 
 San Benedetto, main parish church of the village, it was built in 1967.
 Villa Sforzesca, known as Pomonte farmhouse, it was built by the Sforza family in 1577.

References

Bibliography 
 Aldo Mazzolai, Guida della Maremma. Percorsi tra arte e natura, Le Lettere, Florence, 1997.
 Giuseppe Guerrini, Torri e castelli della Provincia di Grosseto, Nuova Immagine Editrice, Siena, 1999.

See also 
 Baccinello
 Montorgiali
 Murci
 Pancole, Scansano
 Poggioferro
 Polveraia
 Preselle

Frazioni of Scansano